15 Sagittae (15 Sge) is a star in the northern constellation Sagitta, located around 58 light years away from the Sun. It is visible to the naked eye as a faint, yellow-hued star with an apparent visual magnitude of 5.80. Considered a solar analog, it was the target of the first radial velocity survey from Lick Observatory, which found a drift due to a companion. In 2002, the cause of this was found to be brown dwarf companion B via direct imaging.

The companion is a high-mass substellar brown dwarf of spectral class L4 ± 1.5, only a few Jupiter masses below the limit for stars, in a long-period orbit around the primary star. Imaged by the Keck telescope, was the first brown dwarf candidate orbiting a sun-like star detected via imaging and is currently the only known companion brown dwarf which both has a significant radial velocity trend on the primary that has also been imaged.

The brown dwarf was originally thought to have a semi-major axis of 14 AU and a circular orbit viewed from pole-on, but ten more years of observations found that the brown dwarf's orbit is viewed from nearly edge-on, is significantly eccentric and appeared to be moving in a circular orbit when first discovered, but is now approaching the primary as viewed from Earth.

References

External links
15 Sagittae (SolStation)

G-type main-sequence stars
L-type stars
Brown dwarfs
Binary stars

Sagitta (constellation)
Durchmusterung objects
Sagittae, 15
0779
190406
098819
7672